"Ashley's Roachclip" is an instrumental by funk group the Soul Searchers from the 1974 album Salt of the Earth on Sussex Records. A portion of the track from 3:30 to 3:50 contains a widely recognized drum break that has been sampled countless times in songs across several genres.

Among the most popular songs that have sampled the break are "Paid in Full" by Eric B. & Rakim, "Hey Young World" by Slick Rick, "Run's House" by Run-DMC, "Set Adrift on Memory Bliss" by P.M. Dawn, "Girl You Know It's True" by Milli Vanilli and "Unbelievable" by EMF.

Personnel 
 Bass guitar - John Euwell
 Congas, bongos - Lino Druitt
 Drums - Kenneth Scoggins
 Flute, saxophone - Lloyd Pinchback
 Guitar - Chuck Brown
 Organ - Bennie Braxton
 Percussion - Donald Tillery, John Buchanan, Kenneth Scoggins, Lino Druitt, Lloyd Pinchback
 Trombone, piano, synthesizer - John Buchanan
 Trumpet - Donald Tillery

References 

1974 songs
Funk songs
Go-go songs
1970s instrumentals
Sampled drum breaks